The Magnolia Gridiron All-Star Classic was an annual post-season college football all-star game held in December 2005 and 2006. The game was organized by Darry Alton, who previously helped found the Las Vegas All-American Classic, in view of the discontinuation of the Blue–Gray Football Classic and the Gridiron Classic, in order to provide players from lesser-known and lesser-televised schools with a chance to impress NFL scouts.

The game was held at Mississippi Veterans Memorial Stadium in Jackson, Mississippi. It matched a team of senior players from Division I-A schools not participating in bowl games, against seniors from Division I-AA, Division II, and Division III schools; both teams also included some NAIA players. In advance of the game, players participated in practice days and a combine, which were open to NFL and CFL scouts.

Game results

Head coaches:
2005 – Kentucky offensive coordinator Joker Phillips (White) and Northwestern State head coach Scott Stoker (Red)
2006 – former Mississippi State head coach Jackie Sherrill (Green) and former Jackson State head coach W. C. Gorden (Red)

2005: White 17, Red 9

2006: Green 32, Red 14

 Game summaries differ from the box score, stating that both Red touchdowns occurred late in the second half.

MVPs
 2006 – Jerry Babb (QB, Louisiana–Lafayette) and Edgar Jones (LB, Southeast Missouri State)

See also
List of college bowl games

References

External links
Official site from February 2007 via Wayback Machine
2005 rosters via Wayback Machine
2006 rosters via Wayback Machine

College football all-star games
American football in Mississippi